England competed at the 1970 British Commonwealth Games in Edinburgh, Scotland, from 16 to 25 July 1970.

England finished second in the medal table.

Medal table (top three)

The athletes that competed are listed below.

Athletics

Badminton

Bowls

Boxing

Cycling

Diving

Fencing

Swimming

Weightlifting

Wrestling

References

1970
Nations at the 1970 British Commonwealth Games
British Commonwealth Games